One Star Story was a powerpop band from Missouri, U.S.A. consisting of lead vocalist and lyricist Vanessa Rose, guitarist Willard Vastine, bass guitarist Bryant Babbitt, drummer Geno Valloni, and touring guitarist Zack Person. The band formed in 2003.

Their latest release, The Empty Room (EP), was produced by Stephen Christian from Anberlin

Discography

EPs
 One Star Story EP (2007) 
 The Empty Room EP (2008)

References

External links
 One Star Story Official Website
 PureVolume

American power pop groups